USRC Black, also known as the Jeremiah S. Black, was a lead of her class schooner built for and operated by the United States Revenue Cutter Service, in service from 1857 to 1868. She is the only revenue cutter to bear the name.

Design and construction 
On 11 November 1856, the United States Revenue Cutter Service put out a contract for the construction of six shallow-draft cutters for use on the Great Lakes. This contract would be issued to Merry and Grey at Milan, Ohio following their bid of $4,050 for each boat. The design was a scaled down version of a previously 140-ton plan by the Revenue Service. The ship's construction was overseen by a Revenue Service captain and delayed by the onset of winter and a controversy surrounding where certain building materials should originate from. Construction also suffered from a $2,333 cost overrun and a lien issued against the builders, with construction finally being completed between June and July 1857. Compared to sister ship 's single six-pounder cannon, the Black was unarmed. Issues regarding the overdue construction was resolved after the revenue service seized the six schooners from the shipbuilders, following the shipyard's debt and a disagreement between the United States Treasury and Ohio financiers regrading the matter. 

The ship was made of white oak, yellow pine, locust wood and copper fastenings. The vessel's rounded stern was decorated with eagle figureheads and ornamental shields.

The hull was named for Jeremiah S. Black on 29 August 1857 who was the sitting Attorney General of President James Buchanan's cabinet.

Service history 
After her entry into service, the Black was first stationed at Erie, Pennsylvania, along the Great Lakes. The American Civil War would see her transferred to Eastport, Maine before Edgartown, Massachusetts in 1866. In 1867 she was ordered to Philadelphia, Pennsylvania where she was laid up on 9 January 1868. She is listed as being sold the same year.

References 

Ships built in Ohio
1857 ships
Ships of the United States Revenue Cutter Service